Dogtown is a traditionally Irish section of St. Louis, Missouri. It is located south of Forest Park, with its southeastern edge abutting the traditionally Italian section of town, The Hill neighborhood. The neighborhood is anchored by St. James the Greater Catholic Church.

Location
The boundaries of Dogtown are Oakland Avenue on the north, Macklind Avenue on the east, and McCausland Avenue on the west. Its southern boundary is generally Manchester Avenue, but between Hampton and Dale Avenues, the southern boundary extends to Interstate 44. Dogtown is not one of the 79 Neighborhoods of St. Louis recognized by the city government. Rather, it is an area that includes four neighborhoods, and part of a fifth: 
 Clayton-Tamm
 Franz Park
 Hi-Pointe
 Cheltenham
 eastern portion of Ellendale

History
Dogtown got its name as a small mining community in the mid-1800s. There was a concentration of small clay and coal mines in the area during that time, and the term "Dogtown" was widely used in the 1800s by miners to describe a group of small shelters around mines.  Although some erroneously think Dogtown was named during the 1904 World's Fair, it actually got its name long before then. An article published on August 14, 1889 in the Missouri Republican is the earliest known reference to Dogtown in St. Louis. The 1889 newspaper article describes a lost 5-year-old boy who lived in "the classic precincts of Dogtown, near Cheltenham."

The term 'dog' appears in official mining terminology (dogholes, doghouse, dogtowns, dogmines, etc.), and it's quite easy to find places all over the U.S. that were called "Dogtown," whose whole existence was due to mining

References

External links
 Dogtown Historical Society
 Map of Dogtown
 St. Patrick's Day Parade

Irish-American culture in Missouri
Irish-American neighborhoods
Neighborhoods in St. Louis